The World Taekwondo Grand Slam is an international taekwondo competition, which unites the athletes who had the best results at international competitions that year. The competition is held every one year, being first held in December 2017 to January 2018.

Editions

All-time medal table
All-time medal count as of 20 December 2019 at the 2019 World Taekwondo Grand Slam.

References

External links

 
Taekwondo competitions
Recurring sporting events established in 2017